Fouad Rachid (born 15 November 1991) is a Comorian international footballer who plays for Luxembourgish club Fola Esch as a midfielder.

Career
Born in Mayotte, Rachid made his debut for Nancy against SM Caen on 12 March 2011, coming on as a substitute for Julien Féret in a 2–0 win. He made his first senior start on 21 August 2011 as Nancy were beaten 1–2 at home by Sochaux. On 22 December 2011, Rachid joined Championnat National side Épinal on loan until the end of the 2011–12 season.

International career
Rachid debuted with Comoros on 11 November 2011 in a 2014 FIFA World Cup qualifier match against Mozambique played in Mitsamiouli.

References

External links 
 
 
 
 
  
 

1991 births
Living people
Comorian footballers
Comoros international footballers
French footballers
French sportspeople of Comorian descent
Mayotte footballers
Association football midfielders
Ligue 1 players
AS Nancy Lorraine players
SAS Épinal players
CS Fola Esch players
Comorian expatriate footballers
Expatriate footballers in France
Expatriate footballers in Luxembourg